Greg Alonzo Bell III (born June 16, 1998) is an American football running back for the Detroit Lions of the National Football League (NFL). He played college football at Arizona Western, Nebraska and San Diego State.

Early life
Bell was born on June 16, 1998 to Gregory Bell and Erica Williams in Chula Vista, California. Bell went to high school at Bonita Vista High School. As a senior, he put up 2,632 yards and 34 touchdowns. Bell received a scholarship from San Diego State University, but he did not have sufficient grades to qualify.

College career

Arizona Western
Bell would go to Arizona Western for his first two collegiate seasons. He scored his first touchdown with the team on September 30, 2016 during a 56–0 blowout win. He would finish the season with 1,187 yards and 7 touchdowns. His 948 conference yards would lead the Western States Football League (WSFL).

In 2017, Bell put up 1,217 yards and 11 touchdowns. He had a 4 touchdown game against Eastern Arizona and a 211 yard game against Glendale.

Nebraska
Bell transferred to Nebraska in 2018. This was the first year under the new redshirt rule stating players can redshirt after four games. Over the first two games of the season, Bell mounted 168 yards on 27 attempts. However, over the next two games, he had 5 yards on 8 attempts. He lost the starting job to veteran Devine Ozigbo.

Bell left the Nebraska program on October 5, 2018 shortly after losing the starting job. He stated he had "earned the starting job and feel I have continued to work the same way but feel I am not being used to my fullest potential." He was released from his scholarship shortly after. After this, Bell posted on Twitter schools he was not allowed to transfer to. One of these schools was Oregon State. This led to Nebraska head coach Scott Frost to publicly accuse Oregon State in tampering with past transfers.

San Diego State
Bell announced his intentions to go to San Diego State University (SDSU) on March 14, 2019. He was to join the team by walking on; SDSU had no scholarships left and therefore was unable to give Bell a scholarship. Before the start of the 2019 season, Bell suffered an injury during weight training that required surgery and sidelined him for the entirety of the season.

In 2020, Bell became the first Aztec to record three straight 100-yard rushing games in a players first three games with the program. He also became the first Aztec since Rashaad Penny in 2017 to record four straight 100-yard rushing games. Bell finished the season with 637 rushing yards on 113 attempts and six touchdowns. 

In 2021, Bell became the 18th 1,000 yard rusher in Aztec history. He finished the season 1,091 rushing yards on 245 attempts and 9 touchdowns. He finished with a total of 1,728 rushing yards, which is the 19th most in SDSU program history.

Statistics

Professional career

Detroit Lions
Bell went undrafted in the 2022 NFL Draft. He was picked up by the Lions on May 1, 2022. He was signed to a 3-year, $2.575 million deal, with $100,000 guaranteed. On July 28, during the Lions' second training day, Bell went down with a hamstring injury. Bell was not claimed through waivers and was put on the Lions' injury reserve. Players put on IR before the 53-man preseason deadline aren't able to return  from IR.

References

1998 births
Living people
American football running backs
Players of American football from California
Sportspeople from Chula Vista, California
People from Chula Vista, California
Nebraska Cornhuskers football players
San Diego State Aztecs football players
Detroit Lions players